Geoffrey Richard Grimmett   (born 20 December 1950) is a mathematician known for his work on the mathematics of random systems arising in probability theory and statistical mechanics, especially percolation theory and the contact process. He is the Professor of Mathematical Statistics in the Statistical Laboratory, University of Cambridge, and was the Master of Downing College, Cambridge, from 2013 to 2018.

Education
Grimmett was educated at King Edward's School, Birmingham and Merton College, Oxford. He graduated in 1971, and completed his DPhil in 1974 under the supervision of John Hammersley and Dominic Welsh.

Career and research
Grimmett served as the IBM Research Fellow at New College, Oxford, from 1974 to 1976 before moving to the University of Bristol. He was appointed Professor of Mathematical Statistics at the University of Cambridge in 1992, becoming a fellow of Churchill College, Cambridge. He was Director of the Statistical Laboratory from 1994 to 2000, Head of the Department of Pure Mathematics and Mathematical Statistics (DPMMS) from 2002 to 2007, and is a trustee of the Rollo Davidson Prize.

He served as the managing editor of the journal Probability Theory and Related Fields from 2000 to 2005, and was appointed managing editor of Probability Surveys in 2009.

At a time of flowering of probabilistic methods in all branches of mathematics, Grimmett is one of the broadest probabilists of his generation, and unquestionably a leading figure in the subject on the world scene. He is particularly recognised for his achievements in the rigorous theory of disordered physical systems. Especially influential is his work on and around percolation theory, the contact model for stochastic spatial epidemics, and the random-cluster model, a class that includes the Ising/Potts models of ferromagnetism. His monograph on percolation is a standard work in a core area of probability, and is widely cited. His breadth within probability is emphasized by his important contributions to probabilistic combinatorics and probabilistic number theory.

In October 2013 he was appointed Master of Downing College, Cambridge, succeeding Barry Everitt. He ended his term as Master on 30 September 2018, being replaced by Alan Bookbinder.

He was appointed Chair of the Heilbronn Institute for Mathematical Research in September 2020.

Awards and honours
Grimmett was awarded the Rollo Davidson Prize in 1989 and elected a Fellow of the Royal Society (FRS) in 2014.

Personal life
Grimmett is the son of Benjamin J Grimmett and Patricia W (Lewis) Grimmett.

He competed at the 1976 Summer Olympics in Montreal as a member of the Great Britain Men's Foil Team, finishing 6th.

References

1950 births
Living people
20th-century English mathematicians
21st-century English mathematicians
British male fencers
Olympic fencers of Great Britain
Fencers at the 1976 Summer Olympics
Fellows of Churchill College, Cambridge
Fellows of New College, Oxford
Cambridge mathematicians
Alumni of Merton College, Oxford
Probability theorists
English statisticians
Fellows of the Royal Society
Masters of Downing College, Cambridge
People educated at King Edward's School, Birmingham
Professors of the University of Cambridge
Probability Theory and Related Fields editors
Mathematical statisticians